The 2021 Kazakhstan Super Cup Final decided the winner of the 2021 Kazakhstan Super Cup, the 14th edition of the annual Kazakh football super cup competition. The match was played on 6 March 2021 at the Turkistan Arena in Turkistan, Kazakhstan.

Tobol won the match 5–4 on penalties to win their first Kazakhstan Super Cup title.

Teams

Route to the final

Match

Summary

Details

Notes

References

2021 Final
2021 in Kazakhstani sport
FC Astana matches
FC Tobol matches